Meyer Zayder (???? – 1930; or Meyer Seider) was  known for shooting Soviet  Grigory Kotovsky on 6 August 1925.
Meyer was head of security at the Peregonovsky sugar factory in 1922–1925.

Biography 
Little is known about Zayder's life before the October Revolution. Zayder was a very wealthy man and was even going to buy a mansion overlooking the Black Sea.

At the same time, the  underground, headed by Grigory Kotovsky, operated in Odessa. It took part in the raids on prisons and counterintelligence of General Denikin, seized weapons and transported it to the Transnistrian partisans, organized sabotage of the railways.

Acquaintance with Kotovsky 
Zayder and Kotovsky met in the following circumstances. One day, fleeing persecution, the latter in the uniform of the captain of artillery came to him, turning directly from the threshold:

Zayder hid Kotovsky in his attic. At night, having disguised himself in civilian clothes and wearing a wig, went down and left his apartment, saying that he was now his debtor.

In 1919, Zayder was adjutant to the gangster and socialist Mishki Japonchik, and was known by the nickname "Majorchik." In 1920, Zayder became unemployed, since the Soviet government, which was finally established in Odessa, closed the brothel owned by him. For two years he was interrupted by casual earnings. In 1922, Zayder learned that a cavalry corps was stationed in Uman, commanded by his debtor Kotovsky, and went to him with a request for help. Kotovsky helped Zayder, arranging that the head of the guard Peregonovsky sugar plant, located near Uman. Zayder, in turn, helped Kotovsky in settling the life of his corps. So, his idea was to prepare skins for cats and exchange them in Ivanovo for fabrics that went to uniforms. Zayder, according to eyewitnesses, was very grateful to Kotovsky for help, since finding work in the early 1920s was very difficult, and there were about 1.5 million people on labor exchanges (as of 1925).

Murder 

In early August 1925, Zayder came to the Chebank farm, where Kotovsky lived temporarily. His motivation was that he wanted to help his family get together on the way back. It is possible that Kotovsky knew in advance about Zayder's arrival, but did not interfere with this, completely trusting him.

In the evening of 5 August 1925, Kotovsky was invited to a "bonfire" at a pioneer camp near Chebanki Luzanovsky, after which he returned home. Approximately at 23:00 on the occasion of Kotovsky's departure, the red commanders who lived in the neighborhood decided to give him a solemn farewell. Kotovsky's wife recalled the moment of the murder:

A bullet shot by a murderer from a revolver hit Kotovsky in the aorta. Death came instantly. Neighbors came running at the shots. The murderer soon appeared himself. Kotovsky's son recalled:

At dawn of the same day, Zayder was arrested. During the investigation and at the trial he fully admitted his guilt, however, he often changed his testimony. So, during the investigation, he claimed that he had shot Kotovsky out of jealousy, and at court stated that he had killed him because he had not raised him up the ranks. The trial took place in August 1926. Zayder was sentenced to 10 years in prison. From the verdict, the charges were excluded in cooperation with the Romanian special services.

The punishment of Meyer Zayder was serving in the Kharkiv pre-trial detention center, he soon became the head of the prison club and was transferred to an unconditional system of detention and was given the right to freely exit from prison to the city. In 1928, not having stayed in prison and three years, Zayder was released on parole for exemplary behavior. After his release, he got a job as a railway wagon co-driver.

In the fall of 1930, the 3rd Bessarabian Cavalry Division, stationed in Berdichev, celebrated the tenth anniversary of its military path. On the occasion of the jubilee, a holiday and maneuvers were to be held, veterans of the division were invited, including the widow of Grigory Kotovsky, Olga Petrovna, who had once served as a doctor in his brigade. One evening three of her former colleagues came to her and said that Meyer Zayder had sentenced them to death. Kotovskaya tried to object to them, saying that Zayder was the only witness to the murder of her husband, and in no case could he kill him, but her arguments did not convince those who prepared the murder. Intending to prevent them, Kotovskaya turned to the division commander Mishuk and the Political Department of the division.

Soon it became known that Meyer Zayder was killed in Kharkiv, not far from the local railway station. His corpse was found on the canvas of the railway. It is likely that, strangling him, the murderers threw Zayder on the rails in the hope of imitating the accident, but the train was late, and their plan failed. As it was later possible to establish, the killing was carried out by three cavalrymen who served together with Kotovsky – some Strigunov, Valdman and the third, whose name is still unknown. Zayder's assassins were not convicted. According to the memoirs of Grigory Grigoryevich Kotovsky's son, the chief organizer of the murder of Zayder was Odessit Valdman, in 1939 he was shot in a very different matter.

Till now many researchers of Kotovsky's murder are convinced that Zayder was not the only and not the most important criminal, but acted under someone else's leadership. The materials about the murder of Kotovsky were classified.

Zayder's friendship with Mishka Yaponchik and Kotovsky's murder, as an act of revenge, became one of the plot lines of the series "The Life and Adventures of Mishka Yaponchik". The role of Meyer Zayder (in the series he appears under the name Izya Majorchik) was performed by Alexey Filimonov.

See also
List of unsolved murders

References

External links 
IF THE CORPS COMMANDERS DIE, THEN IT IS NECESSARY FOR SOMEONE... 75 YEARS AGO WAS KILLED BY THE LEGENDARY KOTOVSK
If the corps commanders are killed, it means someone needs
Collected works. Vol.5. Leaders and companions. Surveillance. Slanders. Persecution
Kotovsky
"Hell of a chieftain." Amazing life and mysterious death of Grigory Kotovsky

1880s births
1930 deaths
Soviet people convicted of murder
Unsolved murders in the Soviet Union
Year of birth unknown